Elliot Benchetrit and Geoffrey Blancaneaux were the defending champions but only Benchetrit chose to defend his title, partnering Johan Tatlot. Benchetrit and Tatlot withdrew before the tournament began.

Philipp Oswald and Filip Polášek won the title after defeating Simone Bolelli and Andrea Pellegrino 6–4, 7–6(7–2) in the final.

Seeds

Draw

References

External links
 Main draw

Open Sopra Steria de Lyon - Doubles
2019 Doubles